Jade Garden (제이드 가든 수목원) is an arboretum located in Chuncheon, South Korea. The garden opened in April 2011. Jade Garden provides walk-through tours and experimental programs, including gardening. The garden is recognised as the filming site of popular Korean television dramas such as That Winter, the Wind Blows, Angel's Last Mission: Love and Young Lady and Gentleman.

The Jade Garden is split into three thematic zones with different biomes and plant types: European, Landscape, and Skyview.

References

External links
English version homepage
Korean version homepage

Tourist attractions in Gangwon Province, South Korea
Arboreta
Forestry in South Korea
2011 establishments in South Korea